Depersonalization can consist of a detachment within the self, regarding one's mind or body, or being a detached observer of oneself. Subjects feel they have changed and that the world has become vague, dreamlike, less real, lacking in significance or being outside reality while looking in. It can be described as feeling like one is on “autopilot” and that the person's sense of individuality or selfhood has been hindered or suppressed.

Chronic depersonalization refers to depersonalization/derealization disorder, which is classified by the DSM-5 as a dissociative disorder, based on the findings that depersonalization and derealization are prevalent in other dissociative disorders including dissociative identity disorder.

Though degrees of depersonalization and derealization can happen to anyone who is subject to temporary anxiety or stress, chronic depersonalization is more related to individuals who have experienced a severe trauma or prolonged stress/anxiety. Depersonalization-derealization is the single most important symptom in the spectrum of dissociative disorders, including dissociative identity disorder and "dissociative disorder not otherwise specified" (DD-NOS). It is also a prominent symptom in some other non-dissociative disorders, such as anxiety disorders, clinical depression, bipolar disorder, schizophrenia, schizoid personality disorder, hypothyroidism or endocrine disorders, schizotypal personality disorder, borderline personality disorder, obsessive–compulsive disorder, migraines, and sleep deprivation; it can also be a symptom of some types of neurological seizure.

In social psychology, and in particular self-categorization theory, the term depersonalization has a different meaning and refers to "the stereotypical perception of the self as an example of some defining social category".

Description 
Individuals who experience depersonalization feel divorced from their own personal self by sensing their body sensations, feelings, emotions, behaviors etc. as not belonging to the same person or identity. Often a person who has experienced depersonalization claims that things seem unreal or hazy. Also, a recognition of a self breaks down (hence the name). Depersonalization can result in very high anxiety levels, which further increase these perceptions.

Depersonalization is a subjective experience of unreality in one's self, while derealization is unreality of the outside world. Although most authors currently regard depersonalization (personal/self) and derealization (reality/surroundings) as independent constructs, many do not want to separate derealization from depersonalization.

Prevalence 
Depersonalization is a symptom of anxiety disorders, such as panic disorder. It can also accompany sleep deprivation (often occurring when experiencing jet lag), migraine, 
epilepsy (especially temporal lobe epilepsy, 
complex-partial seizure, both as part of the aura and during the seizure), 
obsessive-compulsive disorder, severe stress or trauma, anxiety, the use of recreational drugs 
especially cannabis, hallucinogens, ketamine, and MDMA, certain types of meditation, deep hypnosis, extended mirror or crystal gazing, sensory deprivation, and mild-to-moderate head injury with little or full loss of consciousness (less likely if unconscious for more than 30 minutes). 
Interoceptive exposure is a non-pharmacological method that can be used to induce depersonalization.

In the general population, transient depersonalization/derealization are common, having a lifetime prevalence between 26 and 74%. A random community-based survey of 1,000 adults in the US rural south found a 1-year depersonalization prevalence rate at 19%. Several studies, but not all, found age to be a significant factor: adolescents and young adults in the normal population reported the highest rate. In a study, 46% of college students reported at least one significant episode in the previous year. In another study, 20% of patients with minor head injury experience significant depersonalization and derealization. Several studies found that up to 66% of individuals in life-threatening accidents report transient depersonalization at minimum during or immediately after the accidents.

Depersonalization occurs 2-4 times more in women than in men.

A similar and overlapping concept called ipseity disturbance (ipse is Latin for "self" or "itself") may be part of the core process of schizophrenia spectrum disorders. However, specific to the schizophrenia spectrum seems to be "a dislocation of first-person perspective such that self and other or self and world may seem to be non-distinguishable, or in which the individual self or field of consciousness takes on an inordinate significance in relation to the objective or intersubjective world" (emphasis in original).

For the purposes of evaluation and measurement depersonalization can be conceived of as a construct and scales are now available to map its dimensions in  A study of undergraduate students found that individuals high on the depersonalization/derealization subscale of the Dissociative Experiences Scale exhibited a more pronounced cortisol response in stress. Individuals high on the absorption subscale, which measures a subject's experiences of concentration to the exclusion of awareness of other events, showed weaker cortisol responses.

In general infantry and special forces soldiers, measures of depersonalization and derealization increased significantly after training that includes experiences of uncontrollable stress, semi-starvation, sleep deprivation, as well as lack of control over hygiene, movement, communications, and social interactions.

Pharmacological and situational causes 
Depersonalization has been described by some as a desirable state, particularly by those that have experienced it under the influence of mood-altering recreational drugs. It is an effect of dissociatives and psychedelics, as well as a possible side effect of caffeine, alcohol, amphetamine, cannabis, and antidepressants. It is a classic withdrawal symptom from many drugs.

Benzodiazepine dependence, which can occur with long-term use of benzodiazepines, can induce chronic depersonalization symptomatology and perceptual disturbances in some people, even in those who are taking a stable daily dosage, and it can also become a protracted feature of the benzodiazepine withdrawal syndrome.

Lieutenant Colonel Dave Grossman, in his book On Killing, suggests that military training artificially creates depersonalization in soldiers, suppressing empathy and making it easier for them to kill other human beings.

Graham Reed (1974) claimed that depersonalization occurs in relation to the experience of falling in love.

Depersonalization as a psychobiological mechanism 
Depersonalization is a classic response to acute trauma, and may be highly prevalent in individuals involved in different traumatic situations including motor vehicle accident, and imprisonment.

Psychologically depersonalization can, just like dissociation in general, be considered a type of coping mechanism. Depersonalization is in that case unconsciously used to decrease the intensity of unpleasant experience, whether that is something as mild as stress or something as severe as chronically high anxiety and post-traumatic stress disorder.

The decrease in anxiety and psychobiological hyperarousal helps preserving adaptive behaviors and resources under threat or danger.

Depersonalization is an overgeneralized reaction in that it doesn't diminish just the unpleasant experience, but more or less all experience – leading to a feeling of being detached from the world and experiencing it in a more bland way. An important distinction must be made between depersonalization as a mild, short-term reaction to unpleasant experience and depersonalization as a chronic symptom stemming from a severe mental disorder such as PTSD or dissociative identity disorder.

Chronic symptoms may represent persistence of depersonalization beyond the situations under threat.

Treatment 

Treatment is dependent on the underlying cause, whether it is organic or psychological in origin. If depersonalization is a symptom of neurological disease, then diagnosis and treatment of the specific disease is the first approach. Depersonalization can be a cognitive symptom of such diseases as amyotrophic lateral sclerosis, Alzheimer's disease, multiple sclerosis (MS), or any other neurological disease affecting the brain. For those with both depersonalization and migraine, tricyclic antidepressants are often prescribed.

If depersonalization is a symptom of psychological causes such as developmental trauma, treatment depends on the diagnosis. In case of dissociative identity disorder or DD-NOS as a developmental disorder, in which extreme developmental trauma interferes with formation of a single cohesive identity, treatment requires proper psychotherapy, and—in the case of additional (co-morbid) disorders such as eating disorders—a team of specialists treating such an individual. It can also be a symptom of borderline personality disorder, which can be treated in the long term with proper psychotherapy and psychopharmacology.

The treatment of chronic depersonalization is considered in depersonalization disorder.

A 2001 Russian study showed that naloxone, a drug used to reverse the intoxicating effects of opioid drugs, can successfully treat depersonalization disorder. According to the study: "In three of 14 patients, depersonalization symptoms disappeared entirely and seven patients showed a marked improvement. The therapeutic effect of naloxone provides evidence for the role of the endogenous opioid system in the pathogenesis of depersonalization." The anti convulsion drug Lamotrigine has shown some success in treating symptoms of depersonalization, often in combination with a selective serotonin reuptake inhibitor and is the first drug of choice at the depersonalisation research unit at King's College London.

Research 
The Depersonalisation Research Unit at the Institute of Psychiatry in London conducts research into depersonalization disorder. Researchers there use the acronym DPAFU (Depersonalisation and Feelings of Unreality) as a shortened label for the disorder.

In a 2020 article in the Journal Nature, Vesuna, et al. describe experimental findings which show that layer 5 of the retrosplenial cortex is likely responsible for dissociative states of consciousness in mammals.

Studies suggest transgender individuals who have not undergone gender transition experience higher rates of depersonalization and other dissociative symptoms than cisgender individuals. Transgender people who have undergone medical gender transition, such as hormone replacement therapy, have often been found to experience lessened symptoms of depersonalization.

See also

References

Other references 
 

Dissociative disorders
Symptoms and signs of mental disorders